The moustached grass warbler (Melocichla mentalis) is a species of African warbler, formerly placed in the family Sylviidae.

It is widely found throughout Sub-Saharan Africa, although absent in southern parts of the continent.
Its natural habitats are moist savanna and subtropical or tropical moist shrubland.

References

External links
 Moustached grass warbler - Species text in The Atlas of Southern African Birds.

moustached grass warbler
Birds of Sub-Saharan Africa
moustached grass warbler
moustached grass warbler
Taxonomy articles created by Polbot